Leptostylus is a genus of longhorn beetles of the subfamily Lamiinae. It was described by John Lawrence LeConte in 1852.

Species
 Leptostylus albagniri Zayas, 1975
 Leptostylus albicinctus Bates, 1885
 Leptostylus angulicollis Bates, 1885
 Leptostylus arciferus Gahan, 1892
 Leptostylus armatus Monné & Hoffmann, 1981
 Leptostylus asperatus (Haldeman, 1847)
 Leptostylus aspiciens Bates, 1885
 Leptostylus batesi Casey, 1913
 Leptostylus bruesi Fisher, 1942
 Leptostylus calcarius Chevrolat, 1862
 Leptostylus castaneovirescens Zayas, 1975
 Leptostylus cineraceus Bates, 1874
 Leptostylus corpulentus Bates, 1881
 Leptostylus cretatellus Bates, 1863
 Leptostylus cristulatus Bates, 1872
 Leptostylus dealbatus (Jacquelin du Val in Sagra, 1857)
 Leptostylus decipiens Bates, 1880
 Leptostylus diffusus Bates, 1885
 Leptostylus dubitans Bates, 1885
 Leptostylus faulkneri Hovore, 1988
 Leptostylus fernandezi Monné & Hoffmann, 1981
 Leptostylus fuligineus Bates, 1885
 Leptostylus gibbulosus Bates, 1874
 Leptostylus gibbus (Degeer, 1775)
 Leptostylus gnomus Monné & Hoffmann, 1981
 Leptostylus heticus Zayas, 1975
 Leptostylus hilaris Bates, 1872
 Leptostylus hispidulus Bates, 1874
 Leptostylus illitus Zayas, 1975
 Leptostylus incertus (Bates, 1881)
 Leptostylus jolyi Monné & Hoffmann, 1981
 Leptostylus laevicauda Bates, 1880
 Leptostylus latifasciatus Zayas, 1975
 Leptostylus lazulinus Bates, 1880
 Leptostylus leucanthes Bates, 1880
 Leptostylus leucopygus Bates, 1872
 Leptostylus lilliputanus Thomson, 1865
 Leptostylus lividus Hovore, 1989
 Leptostylus macrostigma Bates, 1872
 Leptostylus metallicus Bates, 1880
 Leptostylus nigritus Zayas, 1975
 Leptostylus nordestinus Monné & Hoffmann, 1981
 Leptostylus notaticollis Bates, 1880
 Leptostylus obliquatus Bates, 1880
 Leptostylus obscurellus Bates, 1863
 Leptostylus ochropygus Bates, 1885
 Leptostylus orbiculus Bates, 1880
 Leptostylus ovalis Bates, 1863
 Leptostylus palliatus Bates, 1874
 Leptostylus paraleucus Monné & Hoffmann, 1981
 Leptostylus paulus Monné & Hoffmann, 1981
 Leptostylus perniciosus Monné & Hoffmann, 1981
 Leptostylus petulans Bates, 1885
 Leptostylus phrissominus Bates, 1885
 Leptostylus pilula Bates, 1880
 Leptostylus plautus Monné & Hoffmann, 1981
 Leptostylus pleurostictus Bates, 1863
 Leptostylus plumeoventris Linsley, 1934
 Leptostylus pseudocalcarius Zayas, 1975
 Leptostylus pulcherrimus Bates, 1880
 Leptostylus pygialis Bates, 1872
 Leptostylus quintalbus Bates, 1885
 Leptostylus retrorsus Bates, 1885
 Leptostylus sagittatus (Jacquelin du Val in Sagra, 1857)
 Leptostylus saxuosus Tippmann, 1960
 Leptostylus seabrai Lane, 1959
 Leptostylus signaticauda Bates, 1885
 Leptostylus sleeperi Hovore, 1988
 Leptostylus spermovoratis Chemsak, 1972
 Leptostylus spiculatus Bates, 1880
 Leptostylus subfurcatus Bates, 1880
 Leptostylus transversus (Gyllenhal in Schoenherr, 1817)
 Leptostylus triangulifer Bates, 1872
 Leptostylus trigonus Bates, 1880
 Leptostylus viridescens Bates, 1880
 Leptostylus viriditinctus Bates, 1872
 Leptostylus x-griseus Bates, 1885
 Leptostylus xanthopygus Bates, 1880
 Leptostylus zonatus Bates, 1885

References

 
Acanthocinini